Koloale FC, Honiara, is a Solomon Islands football club, playing in the Telekom S-League. They are based in Honiara. Their ground is Lawson Tama Stadium.

Koloale FC has been one of Solomon Islands most successful clubs in recent years, winning the Honiara FA League in 2001, 2003 and 2008; and the Solomon Islands National Club Championship in 2003 and 2008.

Titles
Solomon Islands National Club Championship/Telekom S-League: (4)
 2003–04, 2008–09, 2010–11, 2011–12.
Honiara FA League: (3)
 2001–02, 2003–04, 2008–09.

Performance in OFC competitions
OFC Champions League: 3 appearances
Best: Finalist in 2009
2009: Finalist
2011: 2° in Group A
2012: 4° in Group B

Current squad

External links
 Current squad (incomplete) - National Football Teams.com
 OFC-Website

References

Football clubs in the Solomon Islands
Association football clubs established in 1998
Honiara
1998 establishments in the Solomon Islands